Olga Nikolayevna Khoroshavtseva (born 24 August 1994) is a Russian freestyle wrestler. She is a two-time gold medalist at the European Wrestling Championships. She also won a bronze medal in the women's 55 kg event at the 2019 World Wrestling Championships held in Nur-Sultan, Kazakhstan. She competed at the 2020 Summer Olympics in Tokyo, Japan.

Career 

In 2015, at the Golden Grand Prix Ivan Yarygin held in Krasnoyarsk, Russia, she won the gold medal in the women's 53 kg event. In 2018, she won the gold medal in the women's 57 kg event at the Russian National Women's Freestyle Wrestling Championships held in Smolensk, Russia. Later that year, she was eliminated in her first match, by Pooja Dhanda of India, in the women's 57 kg event at the 2018 World Wrestling Championships held in Budapest, Hungary.

At the Golden Grand Prix Ivan Yarygin 2019 held in Krasnoyarsk, Russia, she won the silver medal in the women's 57 kg event. A year later, at the Golden Grand Prix Ivan Yarygin 2020, she won the gold medal in the women's 55 kg event.

She also competed in the women's freestyle 57 kg event at the 2019 European Wrestling Championships held in Bucharest, Romania. At the 2020 European Wrestling Championships held in Rome, Italy, she won the gold medal in the women's 55 kg event. In the final, she defeated Solomiia Vynnyk of Ukraine. In 2020, she also won one of the bronze medals in the women's 55 kg event at the Individual Wrestling World Cup held in Belgrade, Serbia.

In 2021, she began competing in the 53 kg weight class and she repeated her previous success at the European Wrestling Championships with a second gold medal. She earned her medal by defeating Maria Prevolaraki of Greece in the women's 53 kg event at the 2021 European Wrestling Championships held in Warsaw, Poland. In May 2021, she qualified at the World Olympic Qualification Tournament in Sofia, Bulgaria to compete in the women's 53 kg event at the 2020 Summer Olympics. A month later, she won the gold medal in the women's 55 kg event at the 2021 Poland Open held in Warsaw, Poland.

At the 2020 Summer Olympics in Tokyo, Japan, she was eliminated in her first match in the women's 53 kg event by Jacarra Winchester of the United States. Two months after the Olympics, she lost her bronze medal match in the women's 55 kg event at the 2021 World Wrestling Championships held in Oslo, Norway.

In January 2022, she won the silver medal in the women's 57 kg event at the Golden Grand Prix Ivan Yarygin held in Krasnoyarsk, Russia. Khoroshavtseva was unable to compete in the final due to illness and forfeited the match to Helen Maroulis of the United States who won the gold medal. In February 2022, she competed in the women's 57 kg event at the Yasar Dogu Tournament held in Istanbul, Turkey.

Achievements

References

External links 

 

Living people
1994 births
Sportspeople from Krasnoyarsk
Russian female sport wrestlers
World Wrestling Championships medalists
European Wrestling Championships medalists
Wrestlers at the 2020 Summer Olympics
European Wrestling Champions
Olympic wrestlers of Russia
21st-century Russian women